SV Hubentut Fortuna is a Netherlands Antilles football team based in Curacao, The club is based in the town of Seru Fortuna, north of Willemstad, and plays in the first division of the Curaçao League.

Overview 
The side topped the league in 2010 Curaçao League Final as well as in 2009 and also finishing third in the 2007–08 season behind CSD Barber.

Achievements 
Netherlands Antilles Championship: 1
2009

Curaçao League: 3
2009, 2010, 2011

Performance in CONCACAF competitions 
CFU Club Championship: 2 appearances  2010, 2012
CFU Club Championship 2010 – First Round group stage – (Caribbean Zone) – hosted by  CSD Barber in Netherlands Antilles.
CFU Club Championship 2012 – First Round group stage – (Caribbean Zone) – hosted by  Alpha United in Guyana.

Current squad, 2013–14

International friendly matches 
May 21, 2010 – SV Hubentut Fortuna vs  AFC Ajax, 0–3

External links 
 Nederlands Antilliaanse Voetbal Unie Review of the 2010 Match

Football clubs in Curaçao
Football clubs in the Netherlands Antilles
1994 establishments in Curaçao
Association football clubs established in 1994